Dambüyük is a village in the Elazığ District of Elazığ Province in Turkey. Its population is 84 (2021). The village is populated by Turks.

Infrastructure 
There is a primary school in the village, but it isn't being used. The village has drinking water network, but there is no sewerage system. There is no PTT branch or PTT agency. There is no health centers and health posts. There is electricity and fixed phones also the road that provides access to the village is asphalt.

References

Villages in Elazığ District